Festivál is the eighth studio album by Santana, released in January 1977. It peaked number twenty seven in the Billboard 200 chart and number twenty nine in the R&B Albums chart.

Track listing

Side one
 "Carnaval" (Tom Coster, Carlos Santana) – 2:15
 "Let the Children Play" (Leon Patillo, Santana) – 3:28
 "Jugando" (José Areas, Santana) – 2:12
 "Give Me Love" (Pablo Téllez) – 4:29
 "Verão Vermelho" (Nonato Buzar) – 5:00
 "Let the Music Set You Free" (Coster, Patillo, David Rubinson, Santana) – 3:39

Side two
 "Revelations" (Coster, Santana)  – 4:37
 "Reach Up" (Coster, Paul Jackson, Patillo, Santana)  – 5:23
 "The River" (Patillo, Santana) – 4:53
 "Try a Little Harder" (Patillo) – 5:04
 "María Caracóles" (Pello el Afrokán - credited "P. African") – 4:32

Personnel
 Oren Waters – vocals, background vocals
 Maxine Willard Waters – vocals, background vocals
 Francisco Zavala – vocals, background vocals
 Carlos Santana – guitar, bass, percussion, vocals, background vocals
 Leon Patillo – keyboards, percussion, piano, vocals, background vocals
 Tom Coster – keyboards, percussion, synthesizer, vocals
 Pablo Téllez – bass, percussion, vocals, background vocals
 Paul Jackson – bass
 Gaylord Birch – drums, percussion, tympani
 José "Chepitó" Areas – conga, percussion, timbales
 Raul Rekow – conga, percussion, background vocals
 Joel Badie – percussion, vocals, background vocals
 Julia Waters – background vocals

Production:
 Fred Catero – engineer
 David Rubinson – engineer, producer

Charts

Certifications

References

Santana (band) albums
1977 albums
Albums produced by Dave Rubinson
Columbia Records albums
Albums recorded at Wally Heider Studios